Gabriel de la Corte (1648 – 6 August 1694) was a Spanish painter specializing in the painting of vases, baskets, garlands and signboards, that he had learned to paint without help of any teacher. Although he was a prolific artist he had little success and lived in poverty. In this context Gabriel was selling his works "on account of the necessity", at a very low price, and some of the Madrid painters of that time charged him with the job of helping them in their minor works.

His compositions are often ornate, and he painted with a confident touch.

Works
Stil-Life of Flowers in a Woven Basket, private collection
Two paintings of the Vase of Flowers
Flowers in a Basket (1680s)
Two paintings of Grotesques with Flowers (1690), Museo del Prado

References 

 This stub has been created on the basis of a public article from   josedelamano art sources

External links

Spanish bodegón painters
17th-century Spanish painters
Spanish male painters
1694 deaths
1648 births